Chudakov (Russian: Чудаков) is a Russian masculine surname, its feminine counterpart is Chudakova. Notable people with the surname include:

Aleksandr Chudakov (1921–2001), Russian physicist in the field of cosmic-ray physics
Alexander Chudakov (1938–2005), Russian philologist and writer
Maria Chudakova, Russian beauty pageant
Marietta Chudakova (1937–2021), Russian literary critic and historian
Nikolai Chudakov (1904–1986), Russian mathematician

Russian-language surnames